Faithfulness is a 1965 Soviet drama film directed by Pyotr Todorovskiy.

Plot 
The film tells about a schoolboy named after Yura, who, as a result of the death of his father, decides to become a cadet at a military school. Once he with a friend are visiting a girl and Yura fell in love with her. After some time, the cadets go to the front...

Cast 
 Vitaliy Chetverikov as Nikitin
 Galina Polskikh as Zoya
 Aleksandr Potapov as Murga
 Yevgeny Evstigneev as Ivan Terentievich
 Antonina Dmitrieva as Zoya's mother
 Valentina Telegina as Woman
 Vasiliy Krasnov as Strokov (as Vasili Krasnov)
 Georgiy Drozd as Platoon commander
 Yu. Zobov as Sergeant major
 Yury Solovyov as Lieutenant
 Vera Kulakova as Lieutenant (as V. Kulakova)

References

External links 
 

1965 films
1960s Russian-language films
Soviet drama films
1965 drama films